V. S. Harindranath is an Indian politician who currently serves as a member of the Kerala State Public Service Commission.

References

Living people
Year of birth missing (living people)
Indian civil servants
Place of birth missing (living people)